Rechsteiner is a surname. Notable people with the surname include:

Kurt Rechsteiner (1931-2017), Swiss cyclist
Martin Rechsteiner (born 1989), Liechtensteiner footballer
The Steiner Brothers
Robert Rechsteiner (born 1961), American real estate broker and professional wrestler
Scott Carl Rechsteiner (born 1962), American professional wrestler
Bronson Rechsteiner (born 1997), American professional wrestler, son of Robert Rechsteiner
Alejandro Rechsteiner (born 1996), Professional better.